Barbara Hines is an American artist.

Barbara Hines may also refer to:
Barbara Hines (baseball), All-American Girls Professional Baseball League ballplayer
Barbara Hines (lawyer), American immigration attorney